Heidi Aassveen Halvorsen (born 1976) is a Norwegian handball goalkeeper. She played eight matches for the national handball team in 2001, and participated at the 2001 World Women's Handball Championship in Italy, where the Norwegian team placed second.

She hails from Tomter. Her clubs were Tomter, Eidsberg, Lunner, Stabæk, Aarhus and Bækkelaget.

References

1976 births
Living people
People from Hobøl
Norwegian female handball players
Expatriate handball players
Norwegian expatriate sportspeople in Denmark
Sportspeople from Viken (county)